"Twist of Fate" is a song recorded by British-Australian singer Olivia Newton-John for the soundtrack to the 1983 film Two of a Kind. Written by Peter Beckett and Steve Kipner, and produced by David Foster, the song was released as the first single from the album on 21 October 1983, and reached number four in Australia and Canada. It reached its peak position of number five on the US Billboard Hot 100 in January 1984, becoming Newton-John's 15th and last top 10 single on the chart. Billboard magazine ranked "Twist of Fate" as the 42nd most popular single of 1984.

"Twist of Fate" accompanying music video was nominated for Best Video, Short Form at the 27th Annual Grammy Awards, but lost to David Bowie's Jazzin' for Blue Jean.

In 2017, the song was featured in the second season of the Netflix series Stranger Things and included on the soundtrack album, Stranger Things: Music from the Netflix Original Series. The album was nominated for Best Compilation Soundtrack for Visual Media at the 61st Annual Grammy Awards.

Track listing and formats 
All tracks produced by David Foster except "Coolin' Down" and "Jolene", produced by John Farrar.
Australian 7-inch vinyl single (Interfusion Records)
"Twist of Fate" (Beckett, Kipner) – 3:39
"Coolin' Down" (Farrar)– 3:57

UK 7-inch vinyl single (EMI Records)
"Twist of Fate"
"Jolene" (Dolly Parton)

US/Canadian 7-inch vinyl single (MCA Records)
"Twist of Fate" – 3:39
"Take a Chance" (with John Travolta) (Foster, Steve Lukather, Olivia Newton-John) – 4:05

US 12-inch vinyl single – Promo Only (MCA Records)
"Twist of Fate (Extended Version)" – 5:18
"Twist of Fate" – 3:39

Charts

Weekly charts

Year-end charts

Certifications and sales

References 

1983 songs
1984 singles
Olivia Newton-John songs
Song recordings produced by David Foster
Songs written by Steve Kipner
MCA Records singles
EMI Records singles
Songs written by Peter Beckett